The Dark Side of the Sun is a 1988 American-Yugoslavian drama film directed by Božidar Nikolić and stars Brad Pitt in his first leading role, as a young man in search of a cure for a rare and deadly skin disease.

Director Božidar Nikolić picked Brad Pitt out of 400 candidates for the main role. Brad Pitt was very happy for the pick and was only paid $1,523 for seven weeks of filming in 1988. The movie was released directly-to-video in 1997.

Plot
Rick is a young American who suffers from a rare skin disease that prevents him from exposing himself to any kind of light, especially sunlight, and is mostly seen as an expert motorcyclist, entirely clad in leather. After having tried several cures without success, his father takes him to a village in Croatia where they meet a healer, who is supposed to save him. But the treatment does not work and when a young American actress falls for him Rick decides to forget about his illness and enjoy life, feeling the sun on his skin for the first time. The disease takes its course but his father understands the choice he made.

Cast
 Brad Pitt as Rick Clayton
 Guy Boyd as Walter Clayton
 Milena Dravić as Emily Clayton
  Nikola Jovanović as Spake
 Cheryl Pollak as Frances
 Gorica Popović as Nina
 Stole Aranđelović as Vidar (the healer)
 Constantin Nitchoff as Ed 
 Sonja Savić as Alan's Girl

Home media 
A Region 4 PAL DVD was released in Australia by the budget label Payless Entertainment under licence from Screen Media.

References

External links

1988 romantic drama films
American romantic drama films
1988 films
English-language Yugoslav films
Films about diseases
Films set in Montenegro
Films shot in Montenegro
Yugoslav romantic drama films
Serbian romantic drama films
Films set in Yugoslavia
1980s English-language films
1980s American films